The Faculty of Science was founded as a Pre-medical School in 1958 by Stang Mongkolsuk, and took the name of Faculty of Science, Mahidol University in 1969. The Faculty is located on Thanon Rama VI, Khwang Thung Phayathai, Khet Ratchathewi, Bangkok, Thailand.  Currently, the Faculty consists of 12 departments: Anatomy, Biochemistry, Biology, Biotechnology, Chemistry, Mathematics, Microbiology, Pathobiology, Pharmacology, Physics, Physiology, and Plant Science.  There are approximately 310 academic staff, with 170 being at doctoral level, 100 at Master’s level, and 40 at Bachelor’s level.

About 
The Faculty is responsible for teaching science to all first-year undergraduate students of the university, presently numbering 3,500 students per year, using its facilities at the Salaya Campus, and also assists in teaching second year students in the allied health sciences and medicine.

The Faculty of Science offers B.Sc. programs in 6 disciplines, namely Chemistry, Biology, Biotechnology, Mathematics, Plant Science, and Physics, to a total of about 300 students per year. The Faculty also has 22 programs at Master’s level and 19 programs at PhD  level, in various scientific disciplines. There are about 600 students at the Master’s level and 250 at the PhD level. 

The Faculty of Science places a strong emphasis on research, not only as part of the thesis work for graduate programs, but also as an ongoing commitment to international scientific advancement and national development.

Research areas
Major research projects undertaken by biomedical science groups involve the application of innovative biotechnology and genetic engineering techniques for the diagnosis, prevention and treatment of tropical diseases in humans and animals, i.e. malaria, melioidosis, schistosomiasis, filariasis, liver flukes, babesiosis, dengue and thalassemia; the reproduction of cattle, important food and medical substances for man and animals from indigenous natural materials; the control and improvement of the environment.

The physical science groups have engaged in many important research projects, such as the studies of physico-chemical properties and utilization of liquid crystals, natural and synthetic polymers, the development of ferrite-polymer composites for industrial applications, chemistry and applications of natural products, organic syntheses of drugs for tropical diseases and other useful compounds, and the use of computers in chemistry, chemical physics and mathematical modeling.

External links

Official Websites
 Mahidol University : Official Website
 Faculty of Science, Mahidol University : Official Website
Centers of Excellence
Research Outputs
Degree Programs

In the News
QS Campus Visit January 2007 - Mahidol University

See also

List of universities in Thailand

Mahidol University
University departments in Thailand
Science education in Thailand